Min Jun-gi (born 18 February 1967) is a South Korean weightlifter. He competed in the men's featherweight event at the 1988 Summer Olympics.

References

1967 births
Living people
South Korean male weightlifters
Olympic weightlifters of South Korea
Weightlifters at the 1988 Summer Olympics
Place of birth missing (living people)